Ippazio Stefano (born 25 August 1945) is an Italian politician and physician.

Stefano was born in Casarano, Italy. He was a member of the Left Ecology Freedom party, and he joined the Italian Left in 2017.

Stefano was elected member of the Senate of Italy in 1992 and 1994. He served as mayor of Taranto from 14 June 2007 to 26 June 2017.

See also
 List of mayors of Taranto
 1992 Italian general election
 1994 Italian general election
 2007 Italian local elections
 2012 Italian local elections

References

External links 
 Municipality of Taranto

Living people
1945 births
People from Lecce
Left Ecology Freedom politicians
Italian Communist Party politicians
Democratic Party of the Left politicians
21st-century Italian politicians
20th-century Italian politicians
Mayors of Taranto
People from Taranto
University of Bari alumni